KMWC 89.9 FM is a radio station licensed to Bethany, Missouri. The station broadcasts a Christian radio format and is owned by Penfold Communications, Inc.

References

External links
 Official Website
 

MWC
Radio stations established in 2013
2013 establishments in Missouri